Valentyn Partyka (29 April 1952 – 28 October 2009) was a Soviet swimmer and swimming coach.

Career
Born in Ukraine, he competed for the Soviet Union in the 200 m and 400 m individual medley events at the 1972 Summer Olympics. He later moved to Estonia, and worked there as a swimming coach. His trainees included his daughter, Olympic swimmer Elina Partõka. He died of a heart attack aged 57.

References

1952 births
2009 deaths
Soviet male swimmers
Olympic swimmers of the Soviet Union
Swimmers at the 1972 Summer Olympics
Male medley swimmers
People from Kramatorsk